Khrenovy (masculine), Khrenovaya (feminine), or Khrenovoye (neuter) is the name of several rural localities in Russia:
Khrenovoye, Bobrovsky District, Voronezh Oblast, a selo in Khrenovskoye Rural Settlement of Bobrovsky District of Voronezh Oblast
Khrenovoye, Novousmansky District, Voronezh Oblast, a selo in Khrenovskoye Rural Settlement of Novousmansky District of Voronezh Oblast
Khrenovaya, a village in Yelninskoye Rural Settlement of Gagarinsky District of Smolensk Oblast